The Oi Rio Pro 2015 was an event of the Association of Surfing Professionals for 2015 ASP World Tour.

This event was held from 11 to 17 May at Rio de Janeiro, (Rio de Janeiro, Brazil) and opposed by 36 surfers.

The tournament was won by Filipe Toledo (BRA), who beat Bede Durbidge (AUS) in final.

Round 1

Round 2

Round 3

Round 4

Round 5

Quarter finals

Semi finals

Final

References

2015 World Surf League
Rio Pro
2015 in Brazilian sport
Sports competitions in Rio de Janeiro (city)
International sports competitions in Rio de Janeiro (city)
Surfing in Brazil